Transcriptional adapter 3-like is a protein that in humans is encoded by the TADA3 gene. Cytogenetic location: 3p25.3

Function 

Many DNA-binding transcriptional activator proteins enhance the initiation rate of RNA polymerase II-mediated gene transcription by interacting functionally with the general transcription machinery bound at the basal promoter. Adaptor proteins are usually required for this activation, possibly to acetylate and destabilize nucleosomes, thereby relieving chromatin constraints at the promoter. The protein encoded by this gene is a transcriptional activator adaptor and has been found to be part of the PCAF histone acetylase complex. In addition, it associates with the tumor suppressor protein p53 and is required for full activity of p53 and p53-mediated apoptosis. At least four alternatively spliced variants have been found for this gene, but the full-length nature of some variants has not been determined.

Interactions 

TADA3L has been shown to interact with:

 Retinoic acid receptor alpha, 
 Retinoid X receptor alpha,
 TADA2L, 
 TAF9, 
 Transcription initiation protein SPT3 homolog,  and
 USP5.

References

Further reading